Two ships of the Royal Australian Navy (RAN) have been named HMAS Ararat, for the town of Ararat, Victoria.

, a Bathurst-class corvette launched in 1943 and scrapped in 1961
, an Armidale-class patrol boat launched in 2006 and active as of 2016

Battle honours
Two battle honours have been awarded to ships named HMAS Ararat:

 Pacific 1943–45
 New Guinea 1943–44

References

Royal Australian Navy ship names